Sanchia Duncan is an English former footballer who played for Fulham L.F.C. Duncan's greatest achievement was winning the 2003 FA Women's Cup Final.

Honours

 FA Women's Cup: 2003
 FA Women's Premier League Cup: 2003

References

Living people
English women's footballers
Fulham L.F.C. players
FA Women's National League players
Women's association football midfielders
Year of birth missing (living people)